Holywell is a hamlet in Dorset, England, located on the A37 roughly midway between Yeovil and Dorchester. A tributary of the River Frome passes through the hamlet.

A number of Bronze Age objects have been discovered locally and are now in the British Museum.

From 1857 to 1966 Holywell was served by  Station on the Heart of Wessex line, which was named after the nearby village to the west.

References

Hamlets in Dorset